Celebrity s.r.o. (English: Celebrity, Inc) is a comedy play written by actor and director Antonín Procházka. The play premiered in 2008 in the J. K. Tyl Theatre in Plzeň, Czech Republic

Story 
The main character, Emil, witnesses a crime in a television studio. His life is changed, as he is forced to leave Eastern Slovakia and the girl he loves.

Cast: J. K. Tyl Theatre production 
Directed by Antonín Procházka
Jana: Štěpánka Křesťanová
Emil: Antonín Procházka
Boss: Monika Švábová
Alan: Pavel Pavlovský
Kamil: Vilém Dubnička
Adéla: Andrea Černá
Captain Kalina: Michal Štěrba
Journalist: Jana Kubátová
Miloš: Zdeněk Rohlíček
Dasha: Veronika Holubová

External links 
Czechoslovak film database
J. K. Tyl Theatre website
Trailer on Youtube

Comedy plays
Plays by Antonín Procházka
Off-Broadway plays